The girls' ice hockey tournament at the 2020 Winter Youth Olympics was held from 17 to 21 January at the Vaudoise Aréna in Lausanne, Switzerland.

Preliminary round
All times are local (UTC+1).

Group A

Group B

Playoff round

Bracket

Semifinals

Bronze medal game

Gold medal game

Final ranking

References

Girls' tournament